Charles August or Carl August (9 July 1768 – 28 May 1810) was a Danish prince. He is best known for serving as Crown Prince of Sweden briefly in 1810, adopted by Charles XIII, before his sudden death from a stroke. Earlier, he had been a general in the Royal Danish Army as well as the Governor-general of Norway. His name before assuming the Swedish title in 1810 was Christian August of Schleswig-Holstein-Sonderburg-Augustenburg, or Christian August of Augustenburg for short.

Family
He was born at Augustenborg Palace in July 1768 as the son of Friedrich Christian I, Duke of Schleswig-Holstein-Sonderburg-Augustenburg (1721–1794) and Princess Charlotte of Schleswig-Holstein-Sonderburg-Plön (1744–1770). He was a younger brother of Frederik Christian II, Duke of Augustenborg, brother-in-law of Princess Louise Auguste of Denmark and an uncle of Caroline Amalie of Augustenburg, Queen consort of Denmark and Christian August, Duke of Augustenborg. He did not marry.

Career in Denmark and Norway
Christian August studied in Leipzig, and returned from there to Denmark-Norway in 1785. He was appointed lieutenant colonel, and was promoted to colonel in 1787 and major general in 1790. From 1797 he was stationed in Austria, joining the fight against Napoleon. He left Austria when the Treaty of Lunéville ended the War of the Second Coalition in 1801. In 1803 Christian August was named commander of Fredriksten Fortress in Norway, assuming the position in 1804.

In 1807 he once again became involved in the Napoleonic Wars, this time on the side of Napoleon as Napoleon's enemy Great Britain assaulted Denmark. The Danish-Norwegian part of the Napoleonic Wars is called the Gunboat War. Sweden joined forces against Denmark-Norway in 1808. Christian August was a central figure in the war, and led forces to victories in the Battle of Prestebakke and the Battle of Toverud, ousting Swedish forces from Norway. In 1808 Christian August was promoted to Field Marshal, and in 1809 he became Governor-general of Norway.

Sweden
On 6 June 1809 the Duke-regent of Sweden was proclaimed King, after Gustav IV Adolf was deposed. The new king Charles XIII accepted the new, liberal Constitution, which was ratified by the Riksdag of the Estates the same day. The new king was in no way likely to interfere with the liberal revolution which had placed him on the throne. Peace was what the exhausted nation now required.

Charles XIII was childless, so in order to secure the succession to the throne, someone had to be adopted as his heir. Georg Adlersparre, the main orchestrator of the 1809 coup, preferred King Frederick VI of Denmark as the new Swedish monarch, but when Frederick refused, Adlersparre looked to Norway. He tried to persuade Christian August, first through the Swedish Baron C. H. Anckarsvärd, and although Christian August did not show up to meet Anckarsvärd personally, he gradually accepted the offer of adoption. His loyalty to his ruler Frederick VI ultimately became a lesser obstacle. The choice of Christian August was supported by Charles XIII as well as three of the estates of the realm; the Clergy, Burghers and Peasants. However, the Nobility was more reluctant due to the influence of so-called Gustavians (Gustavianerna), supporting the deposed King Gustav IV Adolf and his then-underage son. The decision to adopt Charles August became definitive on 15 July 1809. His great popularity in Norway was considered an advantage to the Swedish plans for the acquisition of that country. In addition, he had demonstrated his interest in a rapprochement between the two countries by refraining from invading Sweden during the Finnish War with Russia.

After the Treaty of Fredrikshamn between Sweden and Russia on 17 September 1809 which concluded the Finnish War, Sweden was ready for the inauguration of Charles August. He finally left Norway for Sweden on 7 January 1810. As Crown Prince of Sweden, he changed his name to Charles August. Honors were lavished upon him on his arrival, he was for example made an honorary member of the Royal Swedish Academy of Sciences on 18 April 1810, and was the first person to enjoy this status in that academy. However, he did not live long enough to make a historical impact in Sweden. He suddenly died on 28 May 1810, when he fell off his horse during a military practice in Kvidinge. His autopsy confirmed that he had died of a stroke, but at the same time rumours went that he had been poisoned by Gustavians. Specifically, the Marshal of the Realm Count Axel von Fersen was openly accused of having killed Charles August, and was lynched on 20 June 1810 during the funeral procession of Charles August. Charles August was buried in Riddarholmen Church, the burial church of Swedish monarchs.

Legacy and aftermath
A monument to Charles August was commissioned by Prince Frederik of Hesse and erected in 1810 in the royal park at Bygdøy near Oslo. Before his departure from Oslo, a grand farewell party was held in his honour, and a group of wealthy citizens formed the charitable foundation Prinds Christian Augusts Minde. It acquired a large town house which still bears his name. A street in Oslo, Kristian Augusts gate, was named after him in 1852.

Charles August's successor as adopted Crown Prince, who was accepted by the Riksdag of the Estates in August, was Jean Baptiste Jules Bernadotte.

See also
 House of Schleswig-Holstein-Sonderburg-Augustenburg
 Prinds Christian Augusts Minde - social institution in Oslo named after Charles August

Ancestry

References

Other sources
Blomberg, Wenche  (2006) Prinds Christian Augusts Minde - historie og visjoner om de fattiges kvartal  Norwegian
Sandström, Allan (1994) Sveriges sista krig - de dramatiska åren 1808-1809 (Bokförlaget Libris, Örebro) Swedish

External links

Prinds Christian Augusts Minde

|-

1768 births
1810 deaths
House of Augustenburg
Carl August 1810
Carl August 1810
Norwegian princes
18th-century Danish nobility
19th-century Danish nobility
Danish military personnel of the Napoleonic Wars
Conspiracy theories in Europe 
Members of the Royal Swedish Academy of Sciences 
Danish generals
Danish nobility
Governors-general of Norway
Princes of Schleswig-Holstein-Sonderburg-Augustenburg
People from Augustenborg, Denmark
Grand Commanders of the Order of the Dannebrog
Generals of the Holy Roman Empire
Heirs apparent who never acceded
Burials at Riddarholmen Church